Göcekler  is a small village in Mut district of  Mersin Province, Turkey. At  its situated to the east of Göksu River valley. The population of Göcekler  was only 96  as of 2012. Main economic agriculture. Apricot, grapes and olive are the main crops.

References

Villages in Mut District